Cowan v Scargill [1985] Ch 270 is an English trusts law case, concerning the scope of discretion of trustees to make investments for the benefit of their members. It held that trustees cannot ignore the financial interests of the beneficiaries.

Some of the obiter dicta in Cowan, however, have been implicitly doubted by Harries v The Church Commissioners for England, which held that trustees are entitled to consider the social and moral interests of the beneficiaries where they relate to the express or implied objects of the trust. Furthermore, the Goode Report on Pension Law Reform in 1993 stated the law to be that trustees "are perfectly entitled to have a policy on ethical investment and to pursue that policy, so long as they treat the interests of the beneficiaries as paramount and the investment policy is consistent with the standards of care and prudence required by law." In 2014, the Law Commission (England and Wales) commented that the case should not be seen as precluding pension trustees from taking account of environmental, social and governance factors when making investments.

Facts
The trustees of the National Coal Board pension fund had £3,000 million in assets. Five of the ten trustees were appointed by the NCB and the other five were appointed by the National Union of Mineworkers. The board of trustees set the general strategy, while day to day investment was managed by a specialist investment committee. Under a new "Investment Strategy and Business Plan 1982" the NUM wanted the pension fund to (1) cease new overseas investment (2) gradually withdraw existing overseas investments and (3) withdraw investments in industries competing with coal. This was all intended to enhance the mines' business prospects. The five NCB nominated trustees made a claim in court over the appropriate exercise of the pension fund's powers.

Mr JR Cowan was the deputy-chairman of the board. Arthur Scargill led the NUM and was one of the five member nominated trustees, and represented the other four in person.

Judgment
Megarry VC held the NUM trustees would be in breach of trust if they followed the instructions of the union, saying ‘the best interests of the beneficiaries are normally their best financial interests.’ So if investments of an unethical type ‘would be more beneficial to the beneficiaries than other investments, the trustees must not refrain from making the investments by virtue of the views that they hold.’ Only if all beneficiaries, all of full age, consent to something different is it possible to invest ethically. His judgment outlined his view of the law.

Significance
While the case has often been cited as controversial, given the doubts it may have given rise to over ethical investment, it did not lay down a rule that pension funds or other trustees must single-mindedly act in their beneficiaries' exclusive financial interest, nor did it say that pension trusts cannot invest ethically if they have opted for such an investment in their trust deeds. However Megarry VC did appear to question a previous decision by Brightman J in Evans v London Co-operative Society that pension trustees could take into account the interests of employees of the workplace in making investment decisions. The most important report on pensions, the Goode Report chaired by Roy Goode stated it was clear that Cowan together with the rest of the law on fiduciary duties clearly allowed for ethical investment. The following was reported.

In 2005, authored by Paul Watchman of Freshfields, a report for UNEP suggested that the effects of Cowan had been overstated and that it was no precedent at all for saying ethical considerations could not be taken into account.
In 2014, the Law Commission (England and Wales) reviewed this area of law. It concluded that when trustees make a long term investment in a company they may take account of risks to that company’s long-term sustainability, including risks arising from environmental degradation or from the company’s treatment of customers, suppliers or employees. Trustees may also take account of non-financial factors, where they have good reason to think that the scheme members share their views and that the decision does not risk significant financial detriment. The Law Commission published a six page guide for trustees on this issue.

In 2016, UNEP FI, the PRI, and The Generation Foundation launched a project to end the debate on whether fiduciary duty is a legitimate barrier to the integration of environmental, social and governance (ESG) issues in investment practice and decision-making. This follows the 2015 publication of Fiduciary Duty in the 21st Century by the PRI, UNEP FI, UNEP Inquiry and UN Global Compact which concluded that “failing to consider all long-term investment value drivers, including ESG issues, is a failure of fiduciary duty". It also found that ten years after the Freshfields Report, despite significant progress, many investors had yet to fully integrate ESG issues into their investment decision-making processes.

The Fiduciary Duty in the 21st Century Programme was founded on the realization that there is a general lack of legal clarity globally about the relationship between sustainability and investors’ fiduciary duty. Having engaged with and interviewed over 400 policymakers and investors, the programme published roadmaps setting out recommendations to fully embed the consideration of environmental, social and governance factors in the fiduciary duties of investors across more than eight capital markets, including the UK. Several recommendations are being implemented. Drawing upon findings from Fiduciary Duty in the 21st Century, the European Commission High-Level Expert Group (HLEG) recommended in its 2018 final report that the EU Commission clarify investor duties to better embrace long-term horizon and sustainability preferences.

See also

Re Gestetner Settlement [1953] Ch 672
Evans v London Co-operative Society [1976] CLY 2059, (6 July 1976) Times
Re Hay’s Settlement Trust [1982] 1 WLR 202
Re Manisty’s Settlement [1974] 1 Ch 17, Templeman J, courts will intervene on dispositive discretions (who gets what) if it ‘could be said to be irrational, perverse or irrelevant to any sensible expectation of the settlor'
Klug v Klug [1918] 2 Ch 67
Re Hastings-Bass [1975] Ch 25
Kerr v British Leyland (Staff) Trustees Ltd (1986) [2001] WTLR 1071, pension beneficiaries who have 'purchased their rights' are entitled to 'properly informed consideration' of claims they make
Mettoy Pension Trustees Ltd v Evans [1990] 1 WLR 1587
Stannard v Fisons Pensions Trust Ltd [1992] IRLR 27; [1991] PLR 225
Abacus Trust Co v NSPCC [2001] WTLR 953, trustees took advice on how to minimise tax liability, but did not implement the advice till after the tax year’s end.
Green v Cobham [2000] WTLR 1101, the trustee changed residential status. This meant huge capital gains liability increase. Held, not all factors taken into account, so breach of trust.
Abacus Trust Co v Barr [2003] Ch 409
Sieff v Fox [2005] 1 WLR 3811

Company law
Evans v Brunner, Mond and Co Ltd [1921] 1 Ch 359
Re Lee, Behrens and Co Ltd [1932] 2 Ch 46
Re Horsley & Weight Ltd [1982] Ch 442

Notes

References
JD Hutchinson and CG Cole, ‘Legal Standards Governing Investment of Pension Assets for Social and Political Goals’ (1979–80) 128 U Pa LR 1344, distinguishes ‘totally neutral investment policies’ focusing solely on finance; ‘socially sensitive investment policies’ which find comparable investments and then socially select; and ‘socially dictated investment policies’ which will fall foul of the standard of prudence, when the second only might.
JH Langbein and RA Posner, ‘Social Investing and the Law of Trusts’ (1980–1981) 79 Michigan Law Review 72, 88
James Lorie, Peter Dodd, and Mary Kimpton, The Stock Market: Theories and Evidence (2nd edn 1985) 85, most value from diversification comes from the first 15 or 20 different shares in a portfolio
Lord Nicholls, ‘Trustees and their broader community: where duty, morality and ethics converge’ (1995) 9(3) Trusts Law International 71
Freshfields Bruckhaus Deringer, 'A legal framework for integration of environmental, social an governance issues into institutional investment' (2005) UNEP 8-10
Law Commission of England and Wales 'Fiduciary Duties of Investment Intermediaries' Law Com 350 and Guidance for Trustees: "Is it always about the money?"

External links
Institutional Shareholders' Committee
National Association of Pension Funds
United Nations Principles of Responsible Investment
Ethical Investment Research Service

English trusts case law
1985 in British law
1985 in case law
High Court of Justice cases